The Billboard Music Award for Top Songs Sales Artist was first presented at the 2016 Billboard Music Awards. The Weeknd was the award's inaugural recipient. Drake and BTS are the most-awarded artists in the category, both having won twice: the former in 2017 and 2019, and the latter in 2021 and 2022. Drake, Post Malone, and The Weeknd are the most-nominated artists in the category, each having earned three nominations apiece since 2016. BTS became the first group and Korean artist in BBMA history to win the award, at the 2021 ceremony.

Winners and nominees

References

Billboard awards